Moorilim is a locality in northern Victoria, Australia.
 

References

External links

Towns in Victoria (Australia)
City of Greater Shepparton
Shire of Strathbogie